Arhopala moorei  is a species of butterfly belonging to the lycaenid family described by George Thomas Bethune-Baker in 1896. It is found in  Southeast Asia (Borneo, Thailand, Malay Peninsula, Singapore).

Subspecies
Arhopala moorei moorei (Borneo)
Arhopala moorei busa Corbet, 1941 (Thailand, Malay Peninsula, Singapore)

References

External links
"Arhopala Boisduval, 1832" at Markku Savela's Lepidoptera and Some Other Life Forms

Arhopala
Butterflies described in 1896
Butterflies of Asia
Taxa named by George Thomas Bethune-Baker